M'Boom is an American jazz percussion group founded by drummer Max Roach in 1970. The original members were Roach, Roy Brooks, Warren Smith, Joe Chambers, Omar Clay, Ray Mantilla, and Freddie Waits.

All of M'Boom's members are and always have been percussionists, employing numerous percussion instruments besides the drums. These include bells, gongs, marimba, timpani, vibraphone, xylophone, and musical saw.

Discography
 1973: Re: Percussion (Strata-East)
 1973: Re: Percussion (Baystate)
 1979: M'Boom (Columbia)
 1984: Collage (Soul Note)
 1991: To the Max! (Enja)
 1992: Live at S.O.B.'s New York (Blue Moon)

References

External links
Concert Review, New York Times, June 27, 1986

American jazz ensembles
Percussion ensembles
Strata-East Records artists
Columbia Records artists
Black Saint/Soul Note artists